Jovan Blagojevic may refer to:

Jovan Blagojević (footballer, born 1988), Serbian footballer currently on the Turkish team Altay S.K.
Jovan Blagojevic (soccer, born 1991), Serbian-born Canadian soccer player